Lemonia peilei is a moth in the family Brahmaeidae (older classifications placed it in Lemoniidae). It was described by Walter Rothschild in 1921.

Subspecies
 Lemonia peilei farsica Wiltshire, 1946
 Lemonia peilei klapperichi Wiltshire, 1961
 Lemonia peilei peilei
 Lemonia peilei talhouki Wiltshire, 1952

References

Brahmaeidae
Moths described in 1921